Olesya Kurochkina is a Russian football striker, currently playing for Zvezda Perm in the Russian Women's Football Championship.

She is a member of the Russian national team, and took part in the 2009 European Championship where she scored Russia's last goal in the competition.

Titles
 3 Russian Leagues (2007, 2008, 2009)
 1 Russian Cup (2007)

References

1983 births
Living people
Russian women's footballers
Footballers from Moscow
Russia women's international footballers
Nadezhda Noginsk players
Zvezda 2005 Perm players
CSP Izmailovo players
FC Zorky Krasnogorsk (women) players
Women's association football forwards
FC Chertanovo Moscow (women) players
21st-century Russian women